David Edward Corner (born 15 May 1966) is an English former professional footballer who played as a central defender in the Football League for Sunderland, Cardiff City, Peterborough United, Leyton Orient and Darlington.

Career
Born in Sunderland, Corner joined his hometown club Sunderland in 1984 at the age of 18. After Shaun Elliott suffered an injury during the 1984–85 season, Corner was able to establish himself in the first team and was named in the starting line-up for the 1985 Football League Cup Final against Norwich City in only his fifth appearance for the club. However, a mistake by Corner led to the only goal of the game when he was caught in possession by John Deehan, before the ball fell to Asa Hartford, whose shot deflected in off Gordon Chisholm to seal a victory for Norwich. He later played for Cardiff City, Peterborough United, Leyton Orient, Darlington and Gateshead.

He also participated at the 1985 FIFA World Youth Championship.

References

1966 births
Living people
Footballers from Sunderland
English footballers
Association football defenders
Sunderland A.F.C. players
Cardiff City F.C. players
Peterborough United F.C. players
Leyton Orient F.C. players
Darlington F.C. players
Gateshead F.C. players
English Football League players
National League (English football) players